The 1976 Southwest Conference men's basketball tournament was held March 4–6, 1976, at Moody Coliseum in Dallas, TX. The first round took place February 28 at the higher seeded campus sites.

Number 2 seed Texas Tech defeated 1 seed  74–72 to win their 1st championship and receive the conference's automatic bid to the 1976 NCAA tournament.

Format and Seeding 
The tournament consisted of 9 teams, seeds 2-8 played in an 8 team single-elimination tournament with the winner playing the top seeded team in the tournament final.

Tournament

Final

References 

1975–76 Southwest Conference men's basketball season
Basketball in the Dallas–Fort Worth metroplex
Southwest Conference men's basketball tournament